George A. Bechtel (September 2, 1848 – April 3, 1921?) was an American right fielder and pitcher in professional baseball's early history. He played in all five seasons of baseball's first all-professional league, the National Association, and later played in the first season of baseball's first major league, the National League, when the Association folded. He later became the first player in Major League history to be suspended for life for intentionally losing games for money.

Career
He batted .351 that season while playing in 20 of the team's 28 games, as the Athletics won the season's championship. Bechtel had also played for a couple of other Philadelphia teams during his amateur career before 1870.

When the  season began, he again moved, this time to the Philadelphia Centennials, and was their pitcher in all 14 games that the club played.

On May 26, 1875, after a 2–12 start, Bechtel and fellow Centennial Bill Craver were sold to the Philadelphia Athletics for $1,500. This is the first known sale of ballplayers from one team to another in baseball history. It is theorized that sale was actually an enticement for the Centennials to fold, which they did.

Expulsion
Rumors surrounded Bechtel's play ever since the late 1860s, indicating that he was a very good fielder, one of the better fielders of the day, but his play at times became sloppy. Henry Chadwick once stated regarding his play: "At the commencement of the season, Bechtel's play in left field was equal to any player, but, as the season wore on, he grew careless, and from other causes unnecessary to mention, he played poorly."

On May 30, 1876, in a game against the Mutuals, he made three of the team's nine errors, all three in crucial game situations. After the game, he became a "much suspected man" by the press and his team alike, so the team suspended him for crooked play.

On June 10, Bechtel wired teammate Jim Devlin a message stating "We can make $500 if you lose the game today. Tell John (manager Jack Chapman) and let me know at once. BECHTEL." Devlin wired him back explaining that he was not that kind of player, and presented the telegram to the team's management. Louisville immediately suspended him from the team. Bechtel was picked up by the Mutuals and played in a couple of games for them before the end of the season. The National League followed the lead of the Grays and suspended Bechtel before the  season, and despite attempts for re-instatement, he was denied. Devlin himself was also banned for life the following season when he and a couple of teammates were paid for losing games. At this time, it is unknown when and where Bechtel died, but Peter Morris, a member of the Society for American Baseball Research, claims that he most likely died in Philadelphia on April 3, 1921.

References

External links

Retrosheet

 George Bechtel at SABR (Baseball BioProject)

1848 births
1921 deaths
Baseball players from Philadelphia
19th-century baseball players
Major League Baseball right fielders
Philadelphia Geary players
Philadelphia Keystones (NABBP) players
Philadelphia Athletics (NABBP) players
Philadelphia Athletics (NA) players
New York Mutuals players
Philadelphia White Stockings players
Philadelphia Centennials players
Louisville Grays players
Philadelphia (minor league baseball) players
Major League Baseball controversies
Sportspeople banned for life